is a passenger railway station located in the city of Sukumo, Kōchi Prefecture, Japan. It is operated by the third-sector Tosa Kuroshio Railway and has the station number "TK45".

Lines and Trains

Layout
The station consists of a side platform serving a single elevated track. The station building, which has been built at the base of the elevated structure, is unstaffed and serves only as a waiting room. Access to the platform is by means of a flight of steps and an elevator. An enclosed shelter is provided on the platform for waiting passengers. Parking for cars is available at the station forecourt.

Adjacent stations

|-
!colspan=5|JR Shikoku

|-
!colspan=5|Tosa Kuroshio Railway

History

Passenger statistics
In fiscal 2011, the station was used by an average of 156 passengers daily.

Surrounding area
Enkoji Temple - About 2 km from the station
Sukumo City Hirata Elementary School
Sukumo Municipal Hirata Nursery School

See also
 List of railway stations in Japan

References

External links
Station timetable

Railway stations in Kōchi Prefecture
Railway stations in Japan opened in 1997
Sukumo, Kōchi